The Catholic University of Rennes (Institut catholique de Rennes or ICR) is a Catholic university in Rennes, France. It was founded in 1989, and is located at the Campus de Ker Lann (Rue Blaise Pascal), about 10 km from Rennes in Bruz.

External links 
 

Catholic universities and colleges in France